is a passenger railway station in located in the city of Suzuka,  Mie Prefecture, Japan, operated by the private railway operator Kintetsu Railway.

Lines
Mikkaichi Station is a station on the Suzuka Line, and is located 6.2 rail kilometers from the opposing terminus of the line at Ise-Wakamatsu Station.

Station layout
The station consists of a single side platform served by a single track. There is no station building. The station is unattended.

Platforms

Adjacent stations

History
Mikkaichi Station was opened on April 8, 1963

Passenger statistics
In fiscal 2019, the station was used by an average of 885 passengers daily (boarding passengers only).

Surrounding area
Mie Prefectural Road No. 54 Suzuka Loop Line
Suzuka City Hall

See also
List of railway stations in Japan

References

External links

 Kintetsu: Mikkaichi Station 

Railway stations in Japan opened in 1963
Railway stations in Mie Prefecture
Stations of Kintetsu Railway
Suzuka, Mie